The 2009–10 ASC Douanes season were in the top division of Senegalese football.  They would be placed third in Group A with 23 points, 5 wins and 13  goals.  The goal totals were shared with ASC Port Autonome.

The highest goals scored was ASC HLM with 1-3.

Ligue 1
ASC Diaraf participate in Group A during the 2009-10 season.

Match dates not available
AS Douanes participated in Group A during the 2009-10 season.

Home matches:
AS Douanes - ASC Linguère 1-0
AS Douanes - CSS Richard-Toll 0-0
AS Douanes - ASC Port Autonome 1-2
AS Douanes - ASC HLM 1-3
AS Douanes - Stade de Mbour 1-0
AS Douanes - NGB ASC Niarry-Tally 0-2
AS Douanes - ASC Jeanne d'Arc 2-0
AS Douanes - Dakar UC 1-1

Away matches:
ASC Linguère - AS Douanes 0-1
CSS Richard-Toll - AS Douanes 1-1
ASC Port Autonome - AS Douanes 1-1
ASC HLM - AS Douanes 1-1
Stade de Mbour - AS Douanes 1-1
NGB ASC Niarry-Tally - AS Douanes 0-1
ASC Jeanne d'Arc - AS Douanes 0-0
Dakar US - AS Douanes 0-0

League Cup (Coupe de la Ligue)
Douanes appeared in their second League Cup, the First Round match went into extra time without any goals scored and the club lost to Olympique de Ngor 5-6 in penalty kicks.

Squad

Team kit

|

References

AS Douanes (Senegal)
2009–10 in Senegalese football